Ángel Ortiz (born 27 December 1977) is a Paraguayan retired football player.

Club statistics

National team statistics

References

External links

1977 births
Living people
Paraguayan footballers
People from Areguá
Paraguayan expatriate footballers
Paraguayan Primera División players
Argentine Primera División players
J2 League players
Shonan Bellmare players
Club Guaraní players
Club Libertad footballers
12 de Octubre Football Club players
Club Olimpia footballers
Sportivo Luqueño players
Club Atlético Lanús footballers
Independiente F.B.C. footballers
Association football midfielders
Paraguayan expatriate sportspeople in Argentina
Paraguayan expatriate sportspeople in Japan
Expatriate footballers in Argentina
Expatriate footballers in Japan
Paraguay international footballers